Cataulacus simoni, is a species of ant of the subfamily Myrmicinae, which is a widespread species that can be found from China, India, and Sri Lanka.

References

External links

 at antwiki.org
Itis.gov
Animaldiversity.org

Myrmicinae
Hymenoptera of Asia
Insects described in 1893